A black budget or covert appropriation is a government budget that is allocated for classified or other secret operations of a nation. The black budget is an account expenses and spending related to military research and covert operations.  The black budget is mostly classified because of security reasons. The black budget can be complicated to calculate, but in the United States it has been estimated to be over US$50 billion a year, taking up approximately 7 percent of the US$700 billion American defense budget.

By country

France
In France, the black budget is known as "special funds" (French: fonds spéciaux). In 2020, 70 million euros were spent on the funds, which were also illegally used by ministers to pay themselves. There is no law that regulates use of the funds, though the black budget is voted on every year by deputees.

Russia
According to an estimate by the Moscow-based , about 21% (3.2 trillion rubles) of the Russian federal budget was "black" (not itemized) in 2015. This represents a doubling from 2010. The increase coincided with huge increases in the Russian military budget under Russian President Vladimir Putin.

Turkey 
In Turkey covert appropriations or "discretionary funds" are allocated to the president, the government or state organs from a yearly state budget. Users of discretionary funds are offered guidelines as to how they may use these funds, but they have complete flexibility in their use. Discretionary funds can be used without approval from Parliament or any other state institution and are seen as tools to help the government achieve its goals without spending much time on bureaucratic work. Before 2015 the covert appropriations were only reserved to state organs and the government, but in March 2015, a regulation granting a discretionary fund for the presidency was passed as part of a government-sponsored omnibus bill in the Turkish Parliament. 

The bill, and the discretionary funds in general have been heavily criticized and objected by opposition parties such as Republican People's Party. At the time, it was claimed by opposition parties, that Recep Tayyip Erdoğan was aiming to gain control of the National Intelligence Organization (MİT) with the fund, which was tied to the Prime Ministry back then. MİT was subordinated to the presidency in August 2017.

According to law, covert spending can not exceed 0.5% of total spending in the budget, but an additional 2% can be used as "supplemental appropriations". In 2018 Turkish Ministry of Treasury and Finance estimated that the amount of presidential discretionary funds Erdoğan can use between 2019-2021 would be TL16.5 billion, 0.5% of total spending in the budget. In 2020 alone, the Presidency was granted TL14.1 billion covert appropriations.

United States

The United States Department of Defense has a black budget it uses to fund black projects—expenditures that it does not want to disclose publicly. The annual cost of the United States Department of Defense black budget was estimated at $30 billion in 2008, but was increased to an estimated $50 billion in 2009.
A black budget article by The Washington Post, based on information given by Edward Snowden, detailed how the US allocated $52.8 billion in 2012 for the black budget.

The black budget has been known to hide multiple types of projects from elected officials. With secret code names and hidden figures, the details of the black budget are revealed only to certain people of Congress, if at all.

This budget was approved by the US National Security Act of 1947, which created the Central Intelligence Agency, the National Security Council and reorganized some military bases with help of the Defense Department.

The U.S. Government claims that the money given to this budget investigates advanced sciences and technologies for military uses. This kind of research is responsible for the creation of new aircraft, weapons, and satellites. 

In 2018, some newspapers reported that the Trump administration asked for $81.1 billion for the 2019 black budget. The request included $59.9 billion for the National Intelligence Program, covering non-military programs and activities. Also $21.2 billion for the Military Intelligence Program which covers Intelligence activities by the Department of Defense. “In total, these two are more than 3.4% higher than the FY2018 request and the largest since then... [and it's] the largest announced since the government began disclosing its intelligence budget request in 2007..." according to The Washington Times Andrew Blake.

See also
Contingency Fund for Foreign Intercourse
Special access program

References

External links
 "Paint it Black", a 1997 metroactive article very critical of the use of Black budgets in the US
 "Exposing the Black Budget", a 1995 Wired article with the same stance
Press Release Concerning the Decision on Allocation of Covert Appropriation to the Budget of the Turkish Presidency

Budgets
Government budgets
United States government secrecy